RPD may refer to:

People
 Robert Prentiss Daniel, American psychologist
 Rahul Peter Das, German professor
 Rajendra Prasad Das, Indian archaeologist
 Royal Page Davidson, American scholar
 Richard Paul Davies, English priest
 Richard Peter Davis, American musician
 Robert P. Davis, American author and filmmaker
 Robert Peel Dawson, English-Irish politician
 Rajan P. Dev, Indian actor
 R. Paul Dhillon, Indian-Canadian journalist
 Robert P. Dick, American judge
 Richi Puspita Dili, Indonesian badminton player
 Robert Percy Douglas, British Army general
 Rose Philippine Duchesne, French nun
 Robert P. Dunlap, American politician
 Rosa Pam Durban, American novelist
 R. Palme Dutt, English journalist
 Royden Patrick Dyson, American politician

Organizations
 Raccoon Police Department, fictional organization from the Resident Evil video games
 Raleigh Police Department in North Carolina
 Rashtriya Parivartan Dal, Indian political party
 Reno Police Department in Nevada
 Richmond Police Department in California
 Richmond Police Department in Virginia
 Riverside Police Department in California
 Rochester Police Department in New York
 Rochester Products Division, New York branch of car manufacturer General Motors
 Rockville City Police Department in Maryland
 RPD Energy, American energy company
 RPD International, British design and manufacturing firm

Other
 FAA LID for Rice Lake Regional Airport
 Rack phase difference, an oilfield term
 Reactive plasma deposition, a thin film deposition method
 Recognition primed decision, a decision-making model
 Regional policy dialogue, an initiative of the Inter-American Development Bank
 Relative percent difference, a statistical measure of deviation between two measurements
 Removable partial denture, a dental prosthesis
 RNase PH domain, an exoribonuclease domain in certain enzymes
 Robot programming by demonstration, a technique to teach new skills to robots
 Robust parameter design, a technique for design of processes and experiments
 RPD machine gun, a Soviet light machine gun
 Revenue per day (RPD), a measurement commonly used in the vehicle rental industry

See also 
 RIPD (disambiguation)